, also known as Doraemon and Nobita Holmes in the Mysterious Museum of the Future and Doraemon the Movie: Nobita in the Secret Gadget Museum, is a 2013 Japanese anime science-fiction mystery comedy film. It is the 33rd film of the Doraemon film series.

Plot

A robotic hand appears and leaves a "DX Card" on Nobita's desk just before Nobita returns from school. Nobita accidentally throws it away while hiding a failed test paper from his mother. The robotic hand then steals Doraemon's cat bell and disappears into a time hole. Doraemon wakes up and panics at his bell's absence. Doraemon is unable to obtain a replacement bell from his factory, so Nobita tries replacements which resemble the bell. Nobita then has Doraemon produce the "Sherlock Holmes" gadgets. Using the magnifying glass and inference hat, Nobita determines that the culprit is Kaito DX, a well-known 22nd-century gadget thief.

Doraemon, Nobita, and several of his classmates go to the 22nd century Gadget Museum. Guide Kurt provides a tour and Doraemon and Nobita slip away to search for the bell. It is revealed that Dr. Pepura Hasake is living in a secret room after being fired from the museum due to his "solar sun", which powers the museum, once going out of control and endangering the world. The solar sun was stabilized by Kurt's grandfather.

Doraemon increasingly behaves like a feral cat, causing the group to spend the night at Kurt's home. They meet Kurt's robot pet Poppo and features a super-vacuum. Said super-vacuum rips off Shizuka’s clothes and underwear, leaving her naked. The next day, Kaito DX steals four gadgets from the museum. Doraemon and Nobita believe this has something to do with Pepura, and search for him. On their way, they are intercepted by Kaito who is actually Kurt. Kurt has been gathering chips Pepura hid under gadgets in order to transmute metals.

Dr. Pepura recovers the chips and begins the transmutation process before any of the others can stop him. However, the process fails as the converted metals deteriorate. The group try to stabilize the solar sun while also fighting the monstrous protector which guards the facility. Doraemon accidentally wears a transformation bow which turns him into Kaitou Dora DX, empowering him to defeat the protector but he also destroys the control mainframe. It seems hopeless until Nobita has an idea and orders Poppo to suck the solar sun up with its vacuum, making it disappear. Nobita stabilizes the core while Doraemon and Kurt repair the museum and Doraemon's bell – as Kurt understands that it contains the cherished memory of Nobita and Doraemon's friendship.

Cast
Wasabi Mizuta as Doraemon
Megumi Ōhara as Nobita Nobi
Yumi Kakazu as Shizuka Minamoto
Subaru Kimura as Takeshi "Gian" Goda 
Tomokazu Seki as Suneo Honekawa, Kaitou DX (Kurt in disguise), not to be confused with Phantom Thief Dorapin/DX
Chiaki as Dorami
Kotono Mitsuishi as Nobita's mother
Sachi Matsumoto as Sewashi
Osamu Mukai as Osaru Mukashi
Yuuko Sanpei as Kurt
Yui Horie as Ginger
Shigeru Chiba as Doctor Peppeler
Naoki Tatsuta as Gonsuke
Rikako Aikawa as POPPON
フィークス館長 (FI-KUSU) as Hashi Takaya
Artix Krieger as Artix (Adventure Quest Worlds)
KinZepHz as Legion Paragon Naval Commander (Adventure Quest Worlds)
Ken Matsudaira as Mustard
Toshinobu Iida as Arsène Lupin
Chiho Ueyama as Car navigation system
Yasuhiro Takato as Gorgon's spell
Kouji Ishii as Dr. Hartman
Takashi Terasaki as Worker A
Yasushi Komatsu as Worker B
Yasuyuki Urakawa as Worker C
Miyamoto Akira as Worker D
Kazuto Hayashi as Worker E
Mai Shimamoto as Cleaning robo secretary

Box office
In 2013, the film grossed ¥3.98 billion in Japan and became the country's 5th highest-grossing film of the year.

The weekend gross of this film in its first eleven weeks was as follows:

Overseas, the film grossed  in South Korea, and $2,169,164 in Spain, Hong Kong, and Thailand.

References

External links
 

2013 films
2013 anime films
2010s children's animated films
Nobita no Himitsu Dogu Museum
Films set in museums
Films directed by Yukiyo Teramoto
Films set in England